was a prominent Japanese theatre director. He studied at the University of Tokyo.

He had Marxist leanings, and in 1933 traveled to Russia. On his return to Japan in 1941 he was arrested, and remained in prison until 1945. In 1946 he joined the Japanese Communist Party.

He was a grandson of the Meiji politician Hijikata Hisamoto.

Notes

Japanese theatre directors
1898 births
1959 deaths